"Roc" is a song by American R&B recording artist The-Dream, released as a single for digital download on  January 31, 2012. The song is included on The-Dream's EP Climax, which was ultimately a bonus CD on his fourth studio album IV Play (2013).

Music video
The music video was released on February 23, 2012.

Charts

Radio and release information

Radio adds

Purchaseable release

References

2012 singles
The-Dream songs
Songs written by The-Dream
Songs written by Tricky Stewart
2011 songs
Def Jam Recordings singles